Wedgefield is an industrial area in Western Australia's Pilbara region, off Great Northern Highway 2 km north of South Hedland, and was gazetted in 1973. It contains a variety of light and service industry premises, and also supports a small residential population. It was named for government surveyor Charles Wedge who, in June 1866, investigated Port Hedland as an alternative to Port Walcott to service the De Grey River pastoral industry.

Notes and references

Towns in Western Australia
Port Hedland, Western Australia